Taihe is a town under the administration of Baiyun District, Guangzhou, Guangdong, China. , it administers the following three residential neighborhoods and 12 villages:
Neighborhoods
Heshan Community
Liansheng Community
Fengtai Community

Villages
Xingfeng Village
Suifeng Village
Baishan Village
Helong Village
Toubei Village
Shating Village
Dali Village
Xiejiazhuang Village
Yingxi Village
Caozhuang Village
Tianxin Village

References 

Towns in Guangdong
Baiyun District, Guangzhou